Let's Get Ready is the fourth album by the New Orleans-based rapper Mystikal, released on September 26, 2000. The album debuted at #1 on the Billboard 200, selling 330,663 copies in its first week  It has sold approximately 2,227,536 copies and was certified double platinum in the U.S. The album featured Mystikal's two biggest singles, "Shake Ya Ass", which peaked at #13 on the Billboard Hot 100, and "Danger (Been So Long)", which peaked at #14. It serves as Mystikal's first album since parting ways with No Limit Records

Track listing

Charts

Weekly charts

Year-end charts

Certifications

See also
Number-one albums of 2000 (U.S.)

References

External links

2000 albums
Jive Records albums
Mystikal albums
Albums produced by Bink (record producer)
Albums produced by the Neptunes